S

Ghadir Metro Station is a station on Shiraz Metro Line 1 along Modares Boulevard. The station is located next to Shiraz University of Technology campus.

References

Shiraz Metro stations
Railway stations opened in 2017